The Ethiopian calendar, or Ge'ez calendar () is the official calendar in Ethiopia. It is used as both the civil calendar (in Ethiopia) and an ecclesiastical calendar (in Ethiopia and Eritrea). It is the liturgical year for Ethiopian and Eritrean Christians belonging to the Orthodox Tewahedo Churches (Ethiopian Orthodox Tewahedo Church and Eritrean Orthodox Tewahedo Church), Eastern Catholic Churches (Eritrean Catholic Church and Ethiopian Catholic Church), and Eastern Protestant Christian P'ent'ay (Ethiopian-Eritrean Evangelical) Churches. Most Protestants in the diaspora have the option of choosing the Ethiopian calendar or the Gregorian calendar for religious holidays, with this option being used given that the corresponding eastern celebration is not a public holiday in the western world. The Ethiopian calendar is a solar calendar that has more in common with the Coptic calendar of the Coptic Orthodox Church of Alexandria and Coptic Catholic Church, but like the Julian calendar, it adds a leap day every four years without exception, and begins the year on 29 August or 30 August in the Julian calendar. A gap of seven to eight years between the Ethiopian and Gregorian calendars results from an alternative calculation in determining the date of the Annunciation.

The Ethiopian calendar has twelve months of thirty days plus five or six epagomenal days, which form a thirteenth month. The Ethiopian months begin on the same days as those of the Coptic calendar, but their names are in Ge'ez. A sixth epagomenal day is added every four years, without exception, on 29 August of the Julian calendar, six months before the corresponding Julian leap day. Thus the first day of the Ethiopian calendar year, 1 Mäskäräm, for years between 1900 and 2099 (inclusive), is usually 11 September (Gregorian). It falls on 12 September in years before the Gregorian leap year, however.

New Year's Day 

The Ethiopian New Year is called Kudus Yohannes in Ge'ez and Tigrinya, while in Amharic, the official language of Ethiopia it is called Enkutatash meaning "Gift of jewels". It occurs on 11 September in the Gregorian Calendar; except for the year preceding a leap year, when it occurs on 12 September. The Ethiopian Calendar Year 1998 Amätä Məhrät ("Year of Mercy") began on the Gregorian Calendar Year on 11 September 2005. The Ethiopian calendar Years 1992 and 1996, however, began on the Gregorian Dates of '12 September 1999' and '2003' respectively.

This date correspondence applies for the Gregorian years 1900 to 2099. The Ethiopian calendar leap year is every four without exception, while Gregorian centurial years are only leap years when exactly divisible by 400; thus a set of corresponding dates will most often apply for a single century. As the Gregorian year 2000 is a leap year, the current correspondence lasts two centuries instead.

The start of the Ethiopian calendar year (Feast of El-Nayrouz) falls on 29 or 30 August (in the year just before the Julian leap year). This date corresponds to the Old-Style Julian Calendar; therefore, the start of the year has been transferred forward in the currently used Gregorian Calendar to 11 or 12 September (in the year just before the Gregorian leap year). This deviation between the Julian and the Gregorian Calendar will increase with the passing of the time.

Eras 

To indicate the year, followers of the Ethiopian and Eritrean churches today use the Incarnation Era, which dates from the Annunciation or Incarnation of Jesus on 25 March AD 9 (Julian), as calculated by Annianus of Alexandria c. 400; thus its first civil year began seven months earlier on 29 August AD 8. Meanwhile, Europeans eventually adopted the calculations made by Dionysius Exiguus in AD 525 instead, which placed the Annunciation eight years earlier than had Annianus. This causes the Ethiopian year number to be eight years less than the Gregorian year number from January 1 until 10 or 11 September, then seven years less for the remainder of the Gregorian year.

In the past, a number of other eras for numbering years were also widely used in Ethiopia, Eritrea, and the Kingdom of Aksum.

Calendars of the world 
The most important era – once widely used by Eastern Christianity, and still used by the Coptic Orthodox Church of Egypt was the Era of Martyrs, also known as the Diocletian Era, or the era of Diocletian and the Martyrs, whose first year began on 29 October 328.

Respective to the Gregorian and Julian New Year's Days, 3 to 4 months later, the difference between the Era of Martyrs and the Anno Domini is 285 years (285= 15×19). This is because in AD 525, Dionysius Exiguus decided to add 15 Metonic cycles to the existing 13 Metonic cycles of the Diocletian Era (15×19 + 13×19 = 532) to obtain an entire 532 year medieval Easter cycle, whose first cycle ended with the year Era of Martyrs 247 (= 13×20) equal to year DXXXI. It is also because 532 is the product of the Metonic cycle of 20 years and the solar cycle of 28 years. It has 13 months in a year.

Anno Mundi according to Panodoros 
Around AD 400, an Alexandrine monk called Panodoros fixed the Alexandrian Era (Anno Mundi = in the year of the world), the date of creation, on 29 August 5493 BC. After the 6th century AD, the era was used by Egyptian, Ethiopian, and Eritrean chronologists. The twelfth 532 year-cycle of this era began on 29 August AD 360, and so 4×19 years after the Era of Martyrs.

Anno Mundi according to Anianos 
Bishop Anianos preferred the Annunciation style as New Year's Day, 25 March (see above). Thus he shifted the Panodoros era by about six months, to begin on 25 March 5492 BC. In the Ethiopian calendar this was equivalent to 15 Magabit 5501 B.C. (E.C.). The Anno Mundi era remained in usage until the late 19th century.

Leap year cycle 
The four-year leap-year cycle is associated with the four Evangelists: the first year after an Ethiopian leap year is named the John-year, followed by the Matthew-year, and then the Mark-year. The year with the sixth epagomenal day is traditionally designated as the Luke-year.

There are no exceptions to the four-year leap-year cycle, like the Julian calendar but unlike the Gregorian calendar.

Months 

These dates are valid only from March 1900 to February 2100. This is because 1900 and 2100 are not leap years in the Gregorian calendar, while they are still leap years in the Ethiopian calendar, meaning dates before 1900 and after 2100 will be offset.

See also 
 Egyptian calendar
 Coptic calendar
 Computus
 Era of the Martyrs
 Adoption of the Gregorian calendar

References

Sources 
 "The Ethiopian Calendar", Appendix IV, C.F. Beckingham and G.W.B. Huntingford, The Prester John of the Indies (Cambridge: Hakluyt Society, 1961).
 Ginzel, Friedrich Karl, "Handbuch der mathematischen und technischen Chronologie", Leipzig, 3 vol., 1906–1914

External links 
 Abushakir (Dart/Flutter & JavaScript) Packages for Ethiopian Calendar, DateTime and Feast/Fasting Tracking
 Interactive Ethiopian Calendar

Ethiopian culture
Eritrean culture
Liturgical calendar
Liturgical calendars
Specific calendars
Time in Ethiopia
Time in Eritrea